Andy Burgess (born 1969) is a  British artist based in Tucson, Arizona. He is best known for his abstract depiction of modernist architecture, in particular for mid-century modern homes. Likened to David Hockney, Burgess describes his style as "Pop Geometry". Burgess has exhibited at the Tucson Museum of Art and the University of Arizona Museum of Art, and his represented by at the Cynthia Corbett Gallery in London, Tandem Press in Wisconsin, the Bonner David Galleries in Scotsdale, and the Etherton Gallery in Tucson. Burgess’ known collectors include Kazuo Ishiguro and Emma Thompson.

Early life 
Burgess was born and raised in London, England. He is the son of actor John Burgess and Lana Burgess. Burgess originally studied Politics at the University of Leeds, and interned for Labour Party member Jack Straw, but in the last year of his studies he realized his heart lay not in politics, but art, and took night drawing classes at Jacob Kramer College. Burgess subsequently studied Fine Art at Byam Shaw School of Art, London.

Work 
Burgess cites artists including Piet Mondrian, Stuart Davis, Richard Diebenkorn, David Hockney, Kurt Schwitters, and Edward Hopper, as influences. Burgess' work is synonymous with vibrant colors and straight lines. He applies the principle of collage and grids to his work, eliminating extraneous information and depicting scenes in a simple and precise way. Burgess starts from a sketch or photograph, splits it up with a grid, then builds up the piece with color.

Painting 

While in London, Burgess' paintings typically depicted city scenes. He worked from sketches, locating unusual vantage points, often at high elevation, to sketch his scene before returning to a studio to paint it. Emphasizing shadow and light, while attempting to avoid making the scene too cartoon-like, Burgess aimed to produce a scene somewhere between reality and imagination.

Burgess moved from London to Tucson, Arizona in 2009, where his brother lived. The sunshine of the American Southwest had a significant impact on is work, with Burgess focusing more on mid-century Modern architecture. Buildings by architects including Pierre Koenig, William Krisel, and Donald Wexler, have all been the subject of Burgess' art. His depictions of architecture remain abstract, with Burgess stating “I’m not interested in photorealism" and “I want to explore how paintings can capture how aspirational and romantic these places can be".

In 2021 Burgess began work on a series of artworks for the Chelsea and Westminster Hospital, London. This is part of the Arts in Health program run by CW+, the official charity of Chelsea and Westminster Hospital Foundation Trust.

Printing 
In 2016 Burgess was invited to collaborate with printmakers from the prestigious Tandem Press, Madison, WI. During his residencies at Tandem, Burgess produced lithographs, collages, relief prints, and etchings. Other notable artists featured by Tandem include Lynda Benglis, David Lynch, Art Spiegelman, Swoon, and Mickalene Thomas.

Collages 
Burgess is also known for collages. In his collages he uses vintages ephemera including 1930’s and 1940’s matchbooks, ticket stubs, and advertising, many featuring midcentury typography. Burgess' collages often represent city skylines. His collages are inspired by Kurt Schwitters, Sonia Delaunay, and Russian Constructivism. In March 2018 Burgess presented cubist collages at the Etherton Gallery in Tucson.

Photography 
Burgess is also a photographer. His work is published by Grand Image in Seattle and Rosenstiels in the UK.

Solo exhibitions 

 2020 - Bonner David Galleries, Scotsdale AZ.
 2018 - Bonner David Galleries, Scotsdale AZ.
 2018 - Tucson Historic Preservation Foundation, Tucson, AZ.
 2018 - Tucson Museum of Art, Tuson AZ.
 2016 - Sue Greenwood Fine Art, Laguna Beach, CA.
 2014 - The Cynthia Corbett Gallery, New York, NY.
 2013 - Andrea Schwartz Gallery,  San Francisco, CA.
 2013 - University of Arizona Museum of Art.
 2012 - Sue Greenwood Fine Art, Laguna Beach, CA.
 2012 - Tory Folliard Gallery, Milwaukee, WI.
 2010 - Eric Firestone Gallery, Tucson, AZ.
 2009 - The Cynthia Corbett Gallery, London.
 2008 - Clifton Interiors, London.
 2005 - The Cynthia Corbett Gallery, London.
 2003 - Gavin Graham Gallery, London, United Kingdom.
 2001 - Gallery 27, London.
 2000 - The Gallery in Cork Street, London.
 1999 - Pryory Art Gallery, London.
 1997 - The Tricycle Gallery, London.

Books 

 Modernist House Paintings: Andy Burgess, Nazraeli Press, 2018.
Abstract Paintings and Collage: Andy Burgess, Nazraeli Press.
Signs of Nothing: Andy Burgess, Nazraeli Press.

References 

Living people
British male artists
British abstract artists
1969 births